Mahmudabad or Mahmoud Abad is a city and capital of Mahmudabad County, Mazandaran Province, Iran. It is located on the Caspian Sea. At the 2006 census, its population was 27,561, in 7,513 families. Mahmoudabad, which was once part of the city of Amol and served as its port, has humid subtropical climate with cool and humid winters. The history of the city goes back to 1889 when Haj Mohammad Hassan Khan began development efforts in the city during the reign of Naser al-Din Shah Qajar (1831-1896).

References

Cities in Mazandaran Province
Populated places in Mahmudabad County
Populated coastal places in Iran
Populated places on the Caspian Sea